Ajay Maken (born 12 January 1964) is a politician from the Indian National Congress party. He is the general secretary of the All India Congress Committee (AICC) and member of the Congress Working Committee (CWC). He was formerly a minister in the Indian Cabinet of Prime Minister Dr. Manmohan Singh  and a minister in the Cabinet of Delhi Chief Minister Sheila Dikshit.

He was twice elected as a Member of the Parliament of India, and three times to the Delhi Legislative Assembly. He was the President of Delhi Pradesh Congress Committee.

Political career
Maken has been a two-time Member of Parliament (Lok Sabha from 2004 to 2014) and three-time Member of Legislative Assembly of Delhi (from 1993 to 2004).

At the National level, Maken was the youngest Union Cabinet Minister from the Congress Party for Housing and Urban Poverty Alleviation (2012–13), Union Minister of State (Independent Charge) for Sports and Youth Affairs (2011–12), Union Minister of State for Home Affairs (2009–2011), Union Minister of State for Urban Development (2006–2007).

At the State level, he was Speaker of Delhi Legislative Assembly (2003–04)  at the age of 39, Maken was the youngest Speaker in the Country, a Cabinet Minister of Power, Transport and Tourism (2001-2003) at the age of 37, the youngest until that time and Parliamentary Secretary to the Chief Minister Sheila Dikshit (1998-2001).

Maken was the first NSUI candidate in a direct election to be elected as the President of Delhi University Students Union (DUSU) in 1985, the first B.Sc. Chemistry (Hons.) final year student in this post.

Lok Sabha
In the 2004 general election, Maken represented the Congress for the New Delhi constituency. He defeated a sitting Cabinet Minister, Jagmohan, from the Bharatiya Janata Party.

In the 2009 general elections, he retained the New Delhi Parliamentary constituency. He was appointed the Minister of State for Home Affairs.

In 2011, Maken was appointed the Minister for Sports and Youth Affairs after the 2010 Commonwealth Games scam, replacing M. S. Gill as Sports Minister.

He was appointed Minister for Housing and Urban Poverty Alleviation (I/C) in 2012.

Maken was defeated in the 2014 general elections by the BJP candidate Meenakshi Lekhi. He served as the Congress General Secretary until 2015, when he resigned after the party's failure to win any seat in the 2015 Delhi Legislative Assembly election.

Personal life
Ajay Maken is married and has three children. He received his education in St. Xavier's School, Delhi. Lalit Maken, Ajay Maken's uncle, was elected to Lok Sabha in 1984 but was assassinated in 1985 for his alleged role in the massacre of Sikhs in Delhi in November 1984.

References

External links 

 Official biographical sketch in Parliament of India website

1964 births
Living people
Trade unionists from Delhi
Indian National Congress politicians
India MPs 2004–2009
India MPs 2009–2014
State cabinet ministers of Delhi
Presidents of Delhi University Students Union
Delhi University alumni
Lok Sabha members from Delhi
United Progressive Alliance candidates in the 2014 Indian general election
Speakers of the Delhi Legislative Assembly
Presidents of Delhi Pradesh Congress Committee